The Municipality of Cerkno is a municipality in the Littoral region of Slovenia.
The seat of the municipality is the town of Cerkno. The municipality has around 5,000 people.

History
Historically, the Cerkno Hills belonged to Tolmin County. In the 16th century, the area came under Habsburg rule, and was included in the County of Gorizia and Gradisca. After the end of World War I, the area was occupied by the Italian Army, and then officially annexed to Italy in 1920. Between 1920 and 1943, it was part of the administrative region known as the Julian March. After the Italian armistice in September 1943, Cerkno was liberated by the Yugoslav Partisans and the region became one of the most important centres of Partisan resistance in the Slovenian Littoral. In 1945, the area came under Yugoslav military administration, and in 1947 it was officially annexed to the People's Republic of Slovenia within the Federal People's Republic of Yugoslavia.

Settlements
In addition to the municipal seat of Cerkno, the municipality also includes the following settlements.

 Bukovo
 Čeplez
 Cerkljanski Vrh
 Dolenji Novaki
 Gorenji Novaki
 Gorje
 Jagršče
 Jazne
 Jesenica
 Labinje
 Lazec
 Laznica
 Orehek
 Otalež
 Planina pri Cerknem
 Plužnje
 Poče
 Podlanišče
 Podpleče
 Police
 Poljane
 Ravne pri Cerknem
 Reka
 Šebrelje
 Straža
 Travnik
 Trebenče
 Zakojca
 Zakriž

References

External links

 Municipality of Cerkno at Geopedia
 Cerkno municipal site 

 
Cerkno
1994 establishments in Slovenia